KDUR 91.9 FM is a college and community radio station owned by Fort Lewis College in Durango, Colorado, United States. The station, which serves the Four Corners region of southwest Colorado, operated as 205-watt facility since going on the air in the early 1970s. On May 11, 2010, KDUR received its license from the Federal Communications Commission (FCC) to increase its power to 6,000 watts. In addition to broadcasting diverse music, local public affairs, and alternative news, the station provides educational and training opportunities to college students and community members.

Translator

See also
List of community radio stations in the United States

References

External links

DUR
DUR
Community radio stations in the United States
Radio stations established in 1983